Nicolas Cordier (1567–1612), was a French sculptor, painter and printmaker working in Rome and also known as  "il Franciosino" (the little Frenchman), Nicholas Cordier, or Niccolò da Lorena.

Cordier was born in Saint-Mihiel. As a sculptor he primary produced religious-themed works which were executed for church commissions. Surviving works can be found in various prestigious churches of Rome and in The Louvre. He died in Rome in 1612.

Works
 Image of St. Agnes in the basilica di Sant'Agnese fuori le Mura, Roma
 Statue of David, Aaron, Saint Bernard de Claivaux, Dionisius l'areopagyte, in the chapel named "Borghese" or "Paolina" or "della Madonna" in the basilica di Santa Maria Maggiore, Roma
 Guillaume de Thiene, in the chapel named "Sixte V" or "Sistina" or "Crocifisso", in the basilica di Santa Maria Maggiore, Roma
 Büste Kaiser Aulus Vitellius
  La Zingarellain the Borghese Gallery, Roma
 Statue of Saint Gregory the Great in the Oratorio di Sant'Andrea al Celio, Roma
 Statue of Saint Silvia, mother of Gregory the Great, in the Oratorio di Sant'Andrea al Celio, Roma
 Statue of French king Henri IV, in the basilica di San Giovanni in Laterano, Roma
 Statue of the bust of Michele Cornia, in the basilica di Santa Maria in Ara Coeli, Roma
 Statue of Saint Sebastian, funerary monument of Silvestro Aldobrandini and of Lesa Deti Aldobrandini, statue of the Charity, statue of the bust of Silvio Aldobrandini in the Aldobrandini Chapel, in the basilica di Santa Maria sopra Minerva, Roma
 Statues of Saint Peter and Saint Paul (discussed), in the Abbazia delle Tre Fontane, Roma.

References

1567 births
1612 deaths